GDF may refer to:
 Civic Democratic Forum (Građanski demokratski forum), a political party in Serbia
 Gaz de France, a defunct French energy company
 General Data Format for Biomedical Signals
 Geographic Data Files
 Geological disposal facility
 Glasnost Defense Foundation, a Russian human rights organization
 Global Development Finance, an economic database
 Growth differentiation factor
 Guardia di Finanza, an Italian law enforcement agency
 Guduf-Gava language
 Guyana Defence Force